Wellingborough Grammar School can refer to one of two former schools in Wellingborough:
 A Tudor grammar school, today Wellingborough School, an independent fee-paying day school
 A grammar school established in 1930, which merged into Wrenn School, along with Wellingborough High School